The Man in Grey was a novel by the British writer Lady Eleanor Smith first published in 1941. It was a melodrama set in Regency Britain. A young woman unhappily married to a cold aristocrat falls in love with a strolling actor, but her hopes of eloping to happiness are wrecked by an old school friend who murders her in order to be able to marry her husband.

Adaptation

In 1943 the novel was adapted into a film by Gainsborough Pictures directed by Leslie Arliss and starring James Mason in the title role as well as Margaret Lockwood, Phyllis Calvert and Stewart Granger. The film was a major commercial and critical success and was the first of the series of Gainsborough melodramas which dominated the British box office during the later years of the war during the immediate post war years. Another Smith novel Caravan was turned into a 1946 film Caravan.

References

1941 British novels
British novels adapted into films
Novels set in England
Novels set in the 19th century
Novels by Lady Eleanor Smith
Hutchinson (publisher) books